V. R. Panchamukhi (also referred as Vadiraj Panchamukhi, and Vachaspati V. R. Panchamukhi), is an Indian Economist and Sanskrit scholar. He was born on September17,1936, in Dharwad, Karnataka. He is the eldest son of Vidyaratna Shri R. S. Panchamukhi, an archaeologist and indologist and Sanskrit Scholar.

Early life
Vadiraj was born in  Bagalkot, Karnataka to a Madhwa Brahmin, to Vidyaratna Shri Raghavendracharya, S. Panchamukhi and Kamalabai R. Panchamukhi. He is the sixth child after five sisters.

His father was a renowned epigraphist, archaeologist and Indologist, who dedicated his life to historical research and Indological studies. He was a pioneer in Daasa Sahitya research. His mother built a value system based on the heritage of daasara padagalu. Vadiraj had his early education in Sanskrit and philosophy under the tutelage of his father.

He stood 1st class 1st rank in Karnataka University studying mathematics and statistics in 1956. He was the first to achieve 82.5%. He also achieved 1st rank in Bombay University doing his master's degree in statistics with econometrics in 1958, for which he was awarded the Chancellor's Gold Medal. He completed his Ph.D. in Delhi School of Economics in 1963 with his thesis on 'Applications of Game Theory to Economic Policy and Planning with Illustrations from International Trade and Investments.'

Career
He has made significant contributions in economics and Sanskrit.

Economics
Panchamukhi contributed to the field of economics in multiple ways. His work on the applications of game theory to International Trade Policy analysis was noted as a pioneering work by Jagdish Bhagwati in his Survey of Literature published in the Economic Journal of London School of Economics (1975). His work on 'Effective Rates of Protection and Domestic Resource Cost', prepared and published jointly with Bhagwati and T. N. Srinivasan, made a significant impact on the trade policy regimes of the 1960s and 1970s.

He worked on development models and resource gaps for the countries of the United Nations Economic and Social Commission for Asia and the Pacific (ESCAP) region that were presented under the leadership of Nobel Laureate Jan Tinbergen while he was a staff member of the ESCAP (then ECAFE). This became the basis for Resource Transfer for Development in the ESCAP region in the 1970s. He delivered a lecture at the Special Session of the ESCAP (held in Shanghai, China) on 'Theme of Strategy for Least Developed Countries.' This was used for many resolutions at the ESCAP Special Session.

He was invited to work at the South Centre (organization), Geneva, by Julius Nyerere, the former President of Tanzania, and the then Chairman of the group. His analytical paper on the proposed Multilateral Agreement on Investment was utilized for negotiations at the WTO Ministerial Meetings (Singapore) in the 1990s.

He developed the "Research Information System (RIS)" for the Non-Aligned and other Developing Countries (an autonomous body established by the Ministry of External Affairs (India) in 1984) into an important 'think tank' of the developing world. It provided analytical inputs on international economic topics such as WTO, regional cooperation, investment flows and many others.

He was the Member Secretary of the "P. C. Alexander Committee on Import–Export Policies and Procedures" in 1977 that made path-breaking contributions to the process of liberalization of the trade policy regime in India.

Sanskrit
Panchamukhi wrote multiple books in Sanskrit on the themes of Economics and Management. He composed and published many Sanskrit poems.

As the Chancellor of Rashtriya Sanskrit Vidyapeetha, Tirupathi, for two terms (1998 - 2008), he was instrumental in launching innovative programs such as Sanskrit–Science exhibitions, Sansk-Net, and Digitization of Sanskrit Manuscripts. He launched a new department of Dvaita Vedanta at Rashtriya Sanskrit Vidyapeetha.

He was a board member of Tirumala Tirupati Devasthanams (TTD). He helped build the constitution and enabled the establishment of Sri Venkateswara Vedic University, Tirumala.

Research interests include Bhagavad Gita and Management, ancient Indian thoughts on development, relevance of Sanskrit in modern times and Sanskrit and Science.

He wrote books in which he interpreted the Bhagavad Gita and applied its principles to a modern and contemporary time. He delivered a complete series on "Srimad Bhagavad Gita — Its relevance to contemporary life" which was telecast by SVBC TV (Sri Venkateswara Bhakthi Channel, TTD).

Positions held

Executive positions
 Chairman, Indian Council of Social Science Research (ICSSR)
 Managing Editor, Indian Economic Journal, Indian Economic Association
 Managing Trustee, Indian Economic Association Trust for Research and Development 
 Vice-Chairman, Indian Economic Association Trust for Research and Development
 Vice President, Sukhamoy Chakravarty Memorial Trust
 Honorary Visiting Professor, Institute for Social and Economic Change (ISEC) 
 President, South Asian Association for Regional Cooperation (SAARC) Economic Association
 President, Indian Economic Association, 1994
 President, The Indian Econometric Society, 1998, 1999, 2000
 Convener, VIII World Economic Congress (New Delhi), 1986
 Founder Director General, Research and Information System for the Non Aligned & Developing Countries (now RIS for Developing Countries)
 Member, Research Staff, United Nations Industrial Development Organization (UNIDO), Vienna
 Research Professor, Centre for Policy Research, New Delhi
 Professor of Economics, Institute of Economic Growth, Delhi University
 Economic Advisor, Ministry of Finance (India)
 Member Secretary, P. C. Alexander Committee on Import-Export Policies and Procedures
 Chief of Research and Analysis Division, Trade Development Authority (TDA), New Delhi; Executive Director of TDA in 1977-79
 Economic Affairs Officer, Research and Planning Division, United Nations Economic and Social Commission for Asia and the Pacific (UNESCAP)
 Lecturer, Department of Statistics, Bombay University
 Senior Research Officer/Reader in Econometrics, Department of Economics, Bombay University

He served as consultant to several UN bodies including UNCTAD, UNDP, ILO and multilateral bodies like World Bank, IMF and inter-governmental bodies like G-77 and Non-Aligned Movement (NAM).

 Chancellor, Rashtriya Sanskrit Vidyapeetham (Deemed University), Tirupathi, for two consecutive terms
 President, Akhila Bharata Madhva Sammelana, Udupi

Advisory positions
 Founding Member, Madras School of Economics
 Founding Member, Indian Council for Research on International Economic Relations
 Member, Board of Directors, Indian Overseas Bank
 Member, Board of Directors, Risk Capital and Technology Finance Corporation Ltd. 
 Member, Board of Directors, Industrial Finance Corporation of India (IFCI Ltd); Nominee of IDBI
 Member, Board of Governors, Sri Ram Centre for Industrial Relations
 Member, Governing Body, Centre for Multi-Disciplinary Development Research (CMDR), Dharwad 
 Member, Governing Body, Institute of Labour Development, Jaipur
 Member, Governing Body, Indian Institute of Foreign Trade
 Member, Governing Body, Indian Council of South Asian Co-operation
 Member, Academic Council, Jawaharlal Nehru University

He continues his active pursuits of research and knowledge dissemination as:
 Chancellor (currently), Sri Gurusarvabhouma Sanskrit Vidyapeetham, Mantralayam (AP)
 Executive Director, Gurusarvabhouma Samsodhan Mandir, Mantralayam
 Chairman, The Indian Econometric Society Trust
 President, National Institute of Vedic Science, Bangalore

Books and publications

In economics
Panchamukhi's deep insight into various aspects of economics can be seen in the books authored by him.
 Trade Policies of India - A Quantitative Analysis; Concept Publishers 1978 
 Production & Planning - A Quantitative Study of the Regional Economy of Karnataka; Centre for Multi-Disciplinary Development Research 1981
 Capital Formation & Output in the Third World; Radiant Publishers for RIS 1986
 The Third World and World Economic System (jointly with K M Raipuria, Rajesh Mehta and Nagesh Kumar); Radiant Publishers for RIS 1986
 Planning, Development and the World Economic Order; Radiant Publishers for RIS 1987
 Process of Development in Indian Economy (edited jointly with Prof. P R Brahmananda); Himalaya Publishers 1987
 Money and Finance in World Economic Order (edited jointly with K M Raipuria and Rameshwar Tandon); INDUS Publishing House 1987 
 Sector Propositions (Vol. 2) of the Balance between Industry & Agriculture in Economic Development (edited jointly with Jeffrey G. Williamson); Macmillans 1988 
 Export Financing in India (jointly with others); Research & Information System 1991
 Teaching Economics in India (jointly edited); Interest Publications 1991
 Indian Economy: Policy Perspective (jointly edited); Interest Publications 1991
 Econometric Modeling and Forecasting in Asia (edited with ESCAP); United Nations 1991
 Fiscal Management of the Indian Economy; Interest Publications 1992
 Complementarity in Trade and Production Intra-South Potentials (jointly with others); SAGE Publications 1995
 Towards an Asian Economic Area (edited jointly with Dr. Rehman Sobhan, Bangladesh); Macmillan India 1995

In Sanskrit and philosophy
Panchamukhi has written several books on Indology and Philosophy in Sanskrit, Kannada and English.
 भारतीय आर्थिक सर्वेक्षण (संस्कृत) (Economic Survey of India); Rashtriya Sanskrit Vidyapeetham, Tirupathi 2000 
 Managing One-self: Sri Bhagavad Gita - Theory & Practice; Motilal Banarasidas 2000 
 Indian Classical Thoughts on Economic Development and Management; Bookwell Publication 2000 
 काव्यकुसुमाकर: (Kavyakusumakara) - collection of Sanskrit Poems; Rashtriya Sanskrit Vidyapeetham, Tirupathi 2002
 Human Science in Indian Heritage; Amar Granth Publications for National Institute of Vedic Sciences, Bangalore
 Badarayana's Brahma Sutras - Essentials of Madhwa Philosophy; Interest Publications 1989
 ब्रह्मसूत्रदीपिका (BrahmaSutraDipika) - English Notes based on Tantradipika of Sri Raghavendra Tirtha and Sutradipika of Sri Jagannatha Thirtha; Rashtriya Sanskrit Vidyapeetham, Tirupathi 2002
 श्रीमन्युसूक्त (Shri Manyu Suktam) - English and Kannada translation based on the commentary of Sri Dheerendra Thirtha; Independent Publication
 Shri Yogeendra Taravali - Kannada and English translation of the composition of Sri Sumatindratirtha; Sri Guru Sarvabhowma Sanskrita Vidyapeetham 1993
 Sri Bhagavadgita and the Mind - lecture series conducted at Vienna; Independent publication
 विचारवैभवं (Vicharavaibhavam) - Essays on Indology; Rashtriya Sanskrit Vidyapeetham, Tirupathi 2000
 भारतीय अर्थशास्त्रं (Sanskrit) (Bharatiya ArthaShastram); Rashtriya Sanskrit Samsthanam, New Delhi, 1998

Panchamukhi has authored several monographs, translations and short essays. He has delivered thought provoking convocation addresses as the Chancellor and Chief Guest to several universities.

Awards and recognition
He has won several awards and citations for his scholarly contributions to Economics and Indology
 President of India's Certificate of Honour for Sanskrit 2003
 Vishishta Sanskrita Seva Vrati - Rashtriya Sanskritha Samsthanam, New Delhi 
 Vachaspathi - Lal Bahadur Shastri Sanskrit University, New Delhi 2008 
 Bharatratna M Vishweshwarayya Prasasti - Swadeshi Vijnana Sammelana, Gulbarga University, Karnataka 
 Karnataka Rajyotsava Award - Government of Karnataka
 Sri Gurusarvabhoma Raghavendra Anugraha Prashasti - Sri Raghavendra Swami Mutt, Mantralayam, 2016 
 GITAM Foundation Annual Award - GITAM University, Vishakhapatnam, 2013

References

1936 births
Living people
20th-century Indian economists
20th-century Indian non-fiction writers
English-language writers from India
Indian Indologists
Indian male writers
Indian Sanskrit scholars
Indian social sciences writers
Karnatak University alumni
People from Bagalkot
Sanskrit writers
Scholars from Karnataka
Writers from Karnataka